The CN Tower is an , 26-storey office building located in Edmonton, Alberta, Canada. The building was built by the Canadian National Railway Company as Edmonton's first skyscraper, and at its completion in 1966 was the tallest building in Western Canada. The CN Tower would remain Edmonton's and Western Canada's tallest building until 1971 when it was surpassed by Edmonton House.

History
The building site was originally to the CNR Edmonton station which was constructed in 1905, and subsequently expanded in 1928. The CNR Station was demolished in 1953 and the area in which the expansion was constructed would become the spot the CN Tower would be constructed on in 1966.

Plans for the building would be announced in 1963, with construction started in fall of 1964. Allied Development Corporation of Calgary would hire Abugov & Sunderland to design, and Hashman Construction Company to build the CA$10.5-million CN Tower, which was Western Canada's tallest office building when completed in October 1966. The opening ceremonies for the building were attended by Lieutenant Governor of Alberta Grant MacEwan and Premier Ernest Manning.

The CN Tower exemplified the modern International Style of architecture and is an early example of the tower-podium design. The CN Tower was purchased by the Calgary-based Strategic Group as part of a distress sale, and the last remaining Canadian National Railway employees moved out of the building in 2008. The Canadian National Railway logo is still found over the main entrance and on the top of the building. Canadian National sought to develop a second building in Edmonton as part of a larger downtown redevelopment program, which would have been , 42-storey office building in 1969, however the project was subsequently cancelled.

Built to overlook the old Canadian National rail yard, the building's basement once housed Edmonton's main passenger railway station, until the Canadian National railway tracks leading to Downtown Edmonton were removed in 1998. Since then, passenger trains serving Edmonton have stopped at the Edmonton railway station situated near the former Edmonton City Centre Airport which ceased operations in 2013.

The building suffered structural damage to the exterior on 18 July 2009, during a severe thunderstorm. Two vehicles were crushed by falling debris at the base of the building.

See also
List of tallest buildings in Edmonton

References

External links

Railway stations in Canada opened in 1966
Canadian National Railway stations in Alberta
Via Rail stations in Alberta
Disused railway stations in Canada
Office buildings completed in 1966
Skyscraper office buildings in Canada
Skyscrapers in Edmonton
Railway stations closed in 1998
Terminating vistas in Canada
Towers in Alberta
International style architecture in Canada